Kilbixy is a civil parish in County Westmeath, Ireland. The village of Ballynacarrigy is the largest settlement in the parish.

Kilbixy is one of 6 civil parishes in the barony of Moygoish in the Province of Leinster.

Kilbixy civil parish comprises 22 townlands: Ballallen, Ballycorkey, Ballyhoreen, Ballyhug, Ballynacarrig Old, Ballynacarrigy, Ballynacroghy  Gallowstown, Ballysallagh (Fox), Ballysallagh (Tuite), Balroe, Baronstown, Baronstown Demesne, Charlestown and Abbeyland a.k.a. Ballynamonaster, Cumminstow, Grange, Kilbixy, Kill, Moranstown, Rath, Toor Commons, Tristernagh and Tristernagh Demesne.

The neighbouring civil parishes are: Rathaspick to the north‑west and north, Leny (barony of Corkaree) to the north‑east, Templeoran to the south‑east and 
Kilmacnevan to the south‑west and west.

References

External links
Kilbixy civil parish at the IreAtlas Townland Data Base
Kilbixy civil parish at Townlands.ie
Kilbixy civil parish at Logainm.ie

Civil parishes of County Westmeath